Beirut Open City is a 2008 Lebanese film written and directed by Samir Habchi.  The film takes place after the Lebanese Civil War during the 1990s and the Syrian occupation of Lebanon.

Cast
Khaled El Nabawy
Saad Hamdan
Ali Al-Zein
Joseph Bou Nassar
Rody Klayany
Cyrine Abdelnour
Rodney Haddad
Diamand Bou Abboud

References

External links
 

2008 films
2008 comedy-drama films
2000s Arabic-language films
Lebanese comedy-drama films
2008 comedy films
2008 drama films